The Battle of Jackson, also known as the Battle of Salem Cemetery, was fought on December 19, 1862, in Madison County, Tennessee, during the American Civil War.

Background
The engagement at Jackson occurred during Confederate Brig. Gen. Nathan Bedford Forrest's Expedition into West Tennessee, between December 11, 1862, and January 1, 1863. Forrest wished to interrupt the rail supply line to Maj. Gen. Ulysses S. Grant's army, campaigning down the Mississippi Central Railroad. If he could destroy the Mobile & Ohio Railroad running south from Columbus, Kentucky, through Jackson, Tennessee, Grant would have to curtail or halt his operations. Forrest's 2,100-man cavalry brigade crossed the Tennessee River from December 15 to December 17, heading west. Grant ordered a troop concentration at Jackson under Brig. Gen. Jeremiah C. Sullivan and sent a cavalry force out under Col. Robert G. Ingersoll, to confront Forrest. Forrest, however, smashed the Union cavalry at Lexington on December 18.

Battle
As Forrest continued his advance the next day, Sullivan ordered Col. Adolph Englemann to take a small force northeast of Jackson. At Old Salem Cemetery, acting on the defensive, Englemann's two infantry regiments repulsed a Confederate mounted attack and then withdrew a mile closer to town. To Forrest, the fight amounted to no more than a feint and show of force intended to hold Jackson's Union defenders in place while two mounted columns destroyed railroad track north and south of the town and returned. This accomplished, Forrest withdrew from the Jackson area to attack Trenton and Humboldt. Thus, although the Federals had checked a demonstration by a portion of Forrest's force, a major accomplishment, other Confederates had fulfilled an element of the expedition's mission.

Rose Hill
Rose Hill is a large home built in 1823. During the Battle Of Jackson, Tennessee it was used as a hospital for both the injured Union and the Confederate soldiers. The house stands to this day and is currently somebody's home.

Battlefield preservation
The American Battlefield Trust and its partners have acquired and preserved  of the battlefield as of late 2021.

Notes

References
National Park Service battle description
 CWSAC report update

Further reading
 Wills, Brian Steel. The Confederacy's Greatest Cavalryman: Nathan Bedford Forrest. Lawrence: University Press of Kansas, 1992. .

External links
 Battle description by the Salem Cemetery Battlefield Association

Forrest's Expedition into West Tennessee
Battles of the Western Theater of the American Civil War
Confederate victories of the American Civil War
Battles of the American Civil War in Tennessee
Madison County, Tennessee
1862 in the American Civil War
1862 in Tennessee
December 1862 events